Active Travel England (ATE) is an executive agency being set up by the Government of the United Kingdom. The organisation will be an inspectorate and funding body led by Chris Boardman, the first Active Travel Commissioner for England.

Background
On 28 July 2020, the Government of the United Kingdom announced the establishment of Active Travel England as part of a new cycling and walking plan called Gear Change: A bold vision for cycling and walking.

Functions
The functions of the organisation will be:
Enforcement of new cycling design guidance by local authorities 
Provide advice to improve scheme design, implementation and stakeholder management
Statutory consultee for planning applications for all developments of over a certain (as yet unknown) threshold
Consider applications for funding from the cycling budget (£2bn initially)
Publish annual reports on highway authorities, grading them on their performance on active travel

Funding
The DfT released £250 million in May and £175 million in November to fund active travel infrastructure schemes.

References

2020 establishments in England
Transport in England
Executive agencies of the United Kingdom government